Alexander Fraser of Philorth (died 1623) was a Scottish landowner and founder of Fraserburgh.

He was the eldest son of Alexander Fraser (died 1564) younger of Philorth and Beatrix Keith, a sister of William Keith, 4th Earl Marischal. Their home at Philorth is now known as Cairnbulg Castle.

In March 1570 he started building a tower at Kinnaird Head and a church nearby. He continued to develop the harbour at Faithlie, the modern Fraserburgh, and commenced building a new harbour in 1576. In 1597 he obtained a charter to found a college or university.

James VI wrote to him in April 1589 asking for money to advance his projected marriage with Anne of Denmark. He was knighted at the baptism of Prince Henry at Stirling Castle on 30 August 1594. Fellow knights, including John Boswell of Balmuto had also contributed to the funds for the royal wedding.

He died in July 1623.

There is a portrait of him depicted around the year 1597, including a small dog. The National Museum of Scotland has a pair of small miniatures of Alexander Fraser and his wife Magdalen Ogilvie. These were probably originally set within lockets of gold enamel work like similar Scottish examples.

Marriages and children

Fraser married Magdalen Ogilvie, daughter of Walter Ogilvie of Dunlugas. He married a second wife Elizabeth Maxwell in 1606, a daughter of John, Lord Herries, and widow of John Gordon of Lochinvar. Her son, Robert Gordon of Lochinvar was knighted at Stirling in 1594.

The children of Alexander Fraser and Magdalen Ogilvie included:
 Alexander Fraser of Philorth, who married Margaret Abernethy, a daughter of George Abernethy, Lord Saltoun in 1595. He built a tower and courtyard at Pittullie near Fraserburgh. Their eldest son was Alexander Fraser, 11th Lord Saltoun
 Margaret Fraser, who married William Hay of Urie

External links
 Pair of miniatures of Alexander Fraser and Magdalen Ogilvie, NMS
 Sketch from the 1597 portrait of Alexander Fraser, NGS

References

1623 deaths
Court of James VI and I